Esmailabad (also Romanized as Esmā‘īlābād) is a village in Gowhar Kuh Rural District, Nukabad District, Khash County, Sistan and Baluchestan Province, Iran. At the 2006 census, its population was 104, in 17 families.

References 

Populated places in Khash County